Orthogonius lucidus is a species of ground beetle in the subfamily Orthogoniinae. It was described by Henry Walter Bates in 1891.

References

lucidus
Beetles described in 1891